This is a list of mountain peaks in the U.S. State of Colorado that exceed  of elevation.

In the mountaineering parlance of the Western United States, a fourteener is a mountain peak with an elevation of at least 14,000 feet.  This is a complete list of the 53 fourteeners in the U.S. State of Colorado with at least  of topographic prominence.  See the main fourteener article, which has a list of all of the fourteeners in the United States, for some information about how such lists are determined and caveats about elevation and ranking accuracy.

The summit of a mountain or hill may be measured in three principal ways:
The topographic elevation of a summit measures the height of the summit above a geodetic sea level.
The topographic prominence of a summit is a measure of how high the summit rises above its surroundings.
The topographic isolation (or radius of dominance) of a summit measures how far the summit lies from its nearest point of equal elevation.



Fourteeners

The following sortable table comprises the 53 Colorado summits with at least  of elevation and at least  of topographic prominence.

Gallery

See also

List of mountain peaks of North America
List of mountain peaks of Greenland
List of mountain peaks of Canada
List of mountain peaks of the Rocky Mountains
List of mountain peaks of the United States
List of mountain peaks of Alaska
List of mountain peaks of California
List of mountain peaks of Colorado
List of the highest major summits of Colorado
List of the major 4000-meter summits of Colorado
List of the major 3000-meter summits of Colorado

List of the most prominent summits of Colorado
List of mountain ranges of Colorado
List of mountain peaks of Hawaii
List of mountain peaks of Montana
List of mountain peaks of Nevada
List of mountain peaks of Utah
List of mountain peaks of Washington (state)
List of mountain peaks of Wyoming
List of mountain peaks of México
List of mountain peaks of Central America
List of mountain peaks of the Caribbean
Colorado
Geography of Colorado
:Category:Mountains of Colorado
commons:Category:Mountains of Colorado
Physical geography
Topography
Topographic elevation
Topographic prominence
Topographic isolation

Notes

References

External links

United States Geological Survey (USGS)
Geographic Names Information System @ USGS
United States National Geodetic Survey (NGS)
Geodetic Glossary @ NGS
NGVD 29 to NAVD 88 online elevation converter @ NGS
Survey Marks and Datasheets @ NGS
14ers.com
Bivouac.com
Peakbagger.com
Peaklist.org
Peakware.com
Summitpost.org
Nomadcolorado.com for printable fourteeners checklist

 
 
Lists of landforms of Colorado
Colorado fourteeners, List of
Colorado fourteeners, List of
Colorado fourteeners, List of